György Rozgonyi (1890 – 30 June 1967) was a Hungarian fencer. He competed in the individual and team foil events at the 1928 Summer Olympics.

References

External links
 

1890 births
1967 deaths
Hungarian male foil fencers
Olympic fencers of Hungary
Fencers at the 1928 Summer Olympics
Martial artists from Budapest